Elazer R. Edelman is an American engineer, scientist and cardiologist. He is the  Edward J. Poitras Professor in Medical Engineering and Science at the Massachusetts Institute of Technology (MIT), Professor of Medicine at Harvard Medical School and at Brigham and Women's Hospital (BWH), and a practicing cardiologist at BWH. He is the director of MIT's Institute for Medical Engineering and Science (IMES), the Harvard-MIT Biomedical Engineering Center, and the MIT Clinical Research Center. He is also the Program Director of the MIT Graduate Education in Medical Sciences program within the Harvard-MIT Division of Health Sciences and Technology.

At BWH, he serves as a senior attending physician in the coronary care unit. He is currently the Chief Scientific Advisor for the journal Science Translational Medicine.

Edelman was elected as a member of the National Academy of Engineering in 2012 for contributions to the design, development, and regulation of local cardiovascular drug delivery and drug eluting stents. He is also a member of the American Academy of Arts and Sciences, National Academy of Inventors and the National Academy of Medicine.

Background and education
Edelman was raised in the greater Boston area. He attended the Massachusetts Institute of Technology, where he received bachelor's degrees in Electrical Engineering and Computer Science (EECS) and in Applied Biology, and a master's degree in EECS. He earned his M.D. degree with distinction from Harvard Medical School and Ph.D. in Medical Engineering and Medical Physics within the Harvard-MIT Division of Health Sciences and Technology. He conducted his Ph.D. thesis work under the direction of Robert Langer to define the mathematics of regulated and controlled drug delivery. Edelman completed his medical training at Brigham and Women's Hospital and is board certified in internal medicine and cardiology. Following this, he spent six years as a research fellow under the tutelage of Prof. Morris J. Karnovsky to work on the biology of vascular repair. Edelman and his wife, Cheryl, have 3 children: Alex, A.J., and Austin.

Research
Edelman is a major advocate of multidisciplinary research. Through his research centers, he combines teams of clinicians, engineers, and scientists from both academia and industry to create highly effective and clinically relevant solutions to medical problems. Through this approach, Edelman and his students have been credited as some of the key contributors and pioneers of the coronary stent. They critically aided in the development, characterization, and optimization of the first bare-metal stents and subsequent iterations including drug-eluting stents. Edelman's research programs fall in the following general categories:
polymer-based controlled and modulated drug delivery
vascular biology, glycobiology, and growth factor biochemistry
tissue engineering
biomaterials and tissue interactions
device biology

Awards and honors
Edelman has authored or co-authored more than 680 original scientific publications, holds some 80 patents, and has trained more than 300 students and post-doctoral fellows. He has served on several advisory boards including the Science Board to the Food and Drug Administration.

Edelman has been elected a fellow of the Association of American Physicians, American College of Cardiology, American Heart Association, American Institute for Medical and Biological Engineering, American Society of Clinical Investigators, American Society of Mechanical Engineers, Association of University Cardiologists, American Academy of Arts and Sciences, National Academy of Engineering, National Academy of Medicine, and National Academy of Inventors. He received the Officer's Cross of the Spanish Order of Civil Merit in 2010.

Selected awards received by Edelman include:
2018: Distinguished Scientist Award, American College of Cardiology
2017: Career Achievement Award, Transcatheter Cardiovascular Therapeutics (TCT)
2016: Plenary Lecture, Royal Academy of Medicine in Ireland Bioengineering Section
2015: Flexner Discovery Lecturer, Vanderbilt University Medical Center
2015: Massimo Calabresi Lecturer, Yale University
2015: Dean's Distinguished Lecture, Weill Cornell Medical School
2014: Lifetime Achievement Award, International Conference on Innovation
2014: Clemson Award for Basic Research, The Society for Biomaterials
2012: Hollingsworth Distinguished Lecturer, University of Texas at Austin Department of Biomedical Engineering, Cockrell School
2011: Lewis Katz Visiting Professorship in Cardiovascular Research, Columbia University
2010: Officer's Cross of the Spanish Order of Civil Merit
2009: Jeffrey M. Hoeg Arteriosclerosis, Thrombosis and Vascular Biology Award for Basic Science and Clinical Research
2007: A. Clifford Barger Excellence in Mentoring Award
2006: American Society for Testing and Materials (ASTM) Joseph S. Barr Award
1992: Marcus Award, American Heart Association
1982: Soma Weiss Award, Harvard Medical School

References

External links
Edelman Lab
Academic Family Tree of Professor Elazer Edelman
 TedMed Talk by Elazer Edelman

People from Boston
MIT School of Engineering faculty
MIT School of Engineering alumni
Harvard Medical School alumni
Engineers from Massachusetts
American cardiologists
Year of birth missing (living people)
Living people
Fellows of the American Institute for Medical and Biological Engineering
Fellows of the American College of Cardiology
Members of the National Academy of Medicine